Nashid al-Amal (lit. “Song of Hope”) is an Egyptian film starring Umm Kulthum. It ran for 125 minutes and was released on January 11, 1937. The film marks the directorial debut of Ahmed Badrakhan.

Synopsis
Ismail divorces his wife Amal, abandoning her and their daughter Salwa. Destiny leads her to the doctor Assem, Salwa’s pediatrician, who notices Amal’s singing talent and helps her build a career. This prompts Amal’s opportunist ex-husband to try and win her back.

Songs
All nine songs feature lyrics by Ahmed Rami. Composers include the following:
 Mohamed el-Qasabgi:
 "منيت شبابي" (“There Goes My Youth”)
 "نامي نامي" (“Nami Nami”)
 "يا بهجة العيد" (“Oh, the Joy of Eid!”)
 "يا للي صنعت الجميل" (“Oh, How Beautiful You Are”)
 "يا مجد يا اشتهيتك" (“O Glory, Oh My Desires”)
 Riad Al Sunbati:
 "افرح يا قلبي"  (“Rejoice, My Heart”) 
 "قضيت حياتي" (“I Dedicate My Life”)
 "نشيد الجامعة" (“The Mosque Song”)
 "يا شباب النيل" (“Oh, Nile Youth!”)

External links
 IMDb page
 El Cinema page

References

Films directed by Ahmed Badrakhan
1937 films